Golabar-e Sofla (also Romanized as Golābar-e Soflá; also known as Ghalabar Sofla, Kulabar, Qolābar-e Pā’īn, Qolābar-e Soflá, Qolābar-e Soflā, Qulabīr Buzurg, and Qulabīr-e Buzurq) is a village in Golabar Rural District, in the Central District of Ijrud County, Zanjan Province, Iran. At the 2006 census, its population was 1,883, in 505 families.

References 

Populated places in Ijrud County